LCDP is a community development organisation working across the city of Lincoln and the county of Lincolnshire.

History
Originally known as Lincoln Community Development Project, LCDP was initiated by the churches of Lincoln to address economic and community development within the city of Lincoln.

It was launched by a group of people in January 1997, led by Andrew Vaughan, industrial chaplain in Lincoln. On the origins of the project, Andrew has said the following:

"There were a lot of creative projects going on like the regeneration of Sessions House and new training schemes being put together, but I felt there was a missing ingredient," he said.

"I thought you can have all this opportunity for people but, unless they feel motivated themselves and supported in a way that forms aspirations, then the great things that were out there would remain untapped."

The project now also provides training courses, funding advice and support to small organisations. Historically the LCDP provided small grants through the Community Chest scheme, but no longer does so.

The project is a Company Limited by Guarantee and has achieved charitable status.

Funding 
The project has received funding and support from a variety of UK and European based public and private funding streams. Present funding for the project comes from:
 European Social Fund
 European Regional Development Fund
 Neighbourhood Renewal Fund
 Lloyds TSB
 Safer & Stronger Communities Fund (SSCF)
 Big Lottery Fund
 Community Empowerment Fund
 Community Chest
 Single Programme
 Sure Start
 Lincolnshire NHS
 Urban Challenge
 City of Lincoln Council

Neighbourhood Management Teams 
In September 2006 LCDP received funding through the Neighbourhood Renewal Fund via the City of Lincoln Council to work in partnership to set up two Neighbourhood Management Teams, on the St Giles and Moorland estates of the City of Lincoln.

BME Mental Health Project 
In January 2007 LCDP began work with the local primary care trust to work with Black and minority ethnic groups across Lincolnshire to combat barriers preventing members of BME communities to access mental healthcare.

References

External links
 Website

Organisations based in Lincolnshire
Organizations established in 1997
Community-building organizations